Stygodiaptomus is a genus of copepods in the family Diaptomidae, containing the following species:
Stygodiaptomus ferus Karanovic, 1999
Stygodiaptomus kieferi Petkovski, 1981
Stygodiaptomus petkovskii Brancelj, 1991

References

Diaptomidae
Taxonomy articles created by Polbot